Boronia deanei, commonly known as Deane's boronia, is a plant in the citrus family Rutaceae and is endemic to the central and southern highlands of New South Wales. It is an erect shrub with crowded, strongly aromatic leaves and white to bright pink flowers in late winter and spring.

Description
They are smooth on the upper surface but glandular-warty on the lower side.

There are eight stamens with glabrous filaments. Flowering occurs between August and November and the fruit is present in December.

Taxonomy and naming
Boronia deanei was first formally described in 1907 by Joseph Maiden and Ernst Betche from a specimen collected by Henry Deane in the Blue Mountains. The description was published in Proceedings of the Linnean Society of New South Wales. The specific epithet (deanei) honours the collector of the type specimen.

In 2002, Marco Duretto described two subspecies and the names have been accepted by the Australian Plant Census:
Boronia deanei subsp. deanei which has leaflets with a blunt tip;    
Boronia deanei subsp. acutifolia  which has leaflets with a pointed tip.

Distribution and habitat
This boronia mainly occurs in the higher Blue Mountains north of Clarence, in the Kanangra-Boyd National Park and south to the South East Forests National Park. It grows near high altitude swamps, in wet heath and in open forest, often in poorly-drained soil.

Conservation
Boronia deanei is listed as "Vulnerable" under the Commonwealth Government Environment Protection and Biodiversity Conservation Act 1999 (EPBC) Act and under the New South Wales Threatened Species Conservation Act 1995. The main threats to its survival are habitat disturbance due to feral pigs (Sus scrofa) and clearing for rural residential developments.

Use in horticulture
Deane's boronia is a reliable and adaptable garden plant which can be grown in poorly-drained soils and is relatively frost-hardy. Its pleasantly scented leaves and pink flowers are attractive features.

References 

deanei
Flora of New South Wales
Plants described in 1907